Snake Eater is a 1989 action/adventure film starring Lorenzo Lamas. It was directed by George Erschbamer and written by Michael Paseornek and John Dunning.  Snake Eater was actor Lorenzo Lamas's first action film.

Plot
Jack "Soldier" Kelly (Lorenzo Lamas), a police officer who served in the Marine Special Forces "Snake Eaters" team in Vietnam. Kelly uses the talents that he learned from the Boss to hunt down the criminals who killed his parents and kidnapped his sister.

The criminals covered their crime, using a bear costume "The Bear". This fooled authorities for their various murders and arson. They also attempted to rape women over the course of many days of captivity, but always failed.

Cast

Sequels
Lamas also starred in two sequels to Snake Eater: Snake Eater II: The Drug Buster (1991), which entered production before the first film was released, and Snake Eater III: His Law (1992).

External links
 

1989 films
1980s action adventure films
English-language Canadian films
Films shot in New Brunswick
Canadian action adventure films
Films produced by John Dunning
1980s English-language films
1980s Canadian films